Dieter Möhl (1936 — May 24, 2012) was a German accelerator physicist. Möhl worked at CERN and contributed substantially to the antiproton programme, the Initial Cooling Experiment (ICE) and was a member of the team which initiated and designed the Low Energy Antiproton Ring (LEAR). The Dieter Möhl Medal and the Dieter Möhl Award are sponsored by CERN as a memorial to him.

References

1936 births
2012 deaths
20th-century German physicists
People associated with CERN